Yoshie is both a Japanese surname and a Japanese given name. Notable people with the name include:

 Family name
, Japanese professional wrestler

 Given name
, Japanese tenor singer
, Japanese actress and singer
, Japanese popular pop singer-songwriter and actress
, Japanese fencer
, Japanese former swimmer 
, Japanese figure skater
, Japanese fugitive
, Japanese actress
, Japanese long jumper
, Japanese volleyball player 
 Yoshie Takeuchi (disambiguation)
 , Japanese freelance announcer
 , Japanese fencer
, Japanese judoka
, Japanese novelist and critic

Japanese-language surnames
Japanese unisex given names